Grujičić is a Serbian surname. People with the name include:

Miroslav Grujičić (born 1994), Serbian football goalkeeper
Srđan Grujičić (born 1987), Serbian football midfielder

Serbian surnames